There were five special elections to the United States House of Representatives in 1949, during the 81st United States Congress.

List of elections 

|-
| 
| John J. Delaney
|  | Democratic
| 1918 
|  | Incumbent died November 18, 1948, during previous congress.New member elected February 15, 1949.Democratic hold.
| nowrap | 

|-
| 
| Sol Bloom
|  | Democratic
| 1923 
|  | Incumbent died March 7, 1949.New member elected May 17, 1949.Liberal gain.
| nowrap | 

|-
| 
| Robert L. Coffey
|  | Democratic
| 1948
|  | Incumbent died April 20, 1949.New member elected September 13, 1949.Republican gain.
| nowrap | 

|-
| 
| Richard J. Welch
|  | Republican
| 1926 
|  | Incumbent died September 10, 1949.New member elected November 8, 1949.Democratic gain.
| nowrap | 

|-
| 
| Andrew L. Somers
|  | Democratic
| 1924
|  | Incumbent died April 6, 1949.New member elected November 8, 1949.Democratic hold.
| nowrap | 

|}

See also 
 List of special elections to the United States House of Representatives

References 

 
1949